Vancouver-Point Grey is a provincial electoral district for the Legislative Assembly of British Columbia, Canada. It was first contested in the general election of 1933. It was created out of parts of Richmond-Point Grey, South Vancouver and Vancouver City. The riding began as a three-member seat, and was reduced to a two-member seat in 1966 when Vancouver-Little Mountain was created. In the redistribution preceding the 1991 election, it was reduced to a one-member riding along with the other older urban ridings, as several new one-member ridings were created.

Many prominent politicians have been elected as members, including three British Columbia premiers, Liberals Christy Clark and Gordon Campbell, and New Democrat incumbent premier David Eby. Former prime minister of Canada Kim Campbell also represented this riding.

Geography 
The district currently comprises the Vancouver neighbourhoods of West Point Grey and the western part of Kitsilano, as well as the adjacent University Endowment Lands and the Point Grey campus of the University of British Columbia.

History

Three-member district

Dual-member district

Single-member district

Election results

Student Vote results 
Student Vote Canada is a non-partisan program in Canada that holds mock elections in elementary and high schools alongside general elections (with the same candidates and same electoral system).

Electoral history 1933–1986 
Note: Winners of each election are in bold.

|-

|Co-operative Commonwealth Fed.
|John (Jack) Evans
|align="right"|6,382 
|align="right"|8.40%
|align="right"|
|align="right"|unknown

|Liberal
|Stanley Stewart McKeen
|align="right"|9,125 
|align="right"|12.01%
|align="right"|
|align="right"|unknown

|Co-operative Commonwealth Fed.
|William Ralph Offer
|align="right"|6,196
|align="right"|8.16%
|align="right"|
|align="right"|unknown

|Liberal
|George Moir Weir
|align="right"|9,235
|align="right"|12.16%
|align="right"|
|align="right"|unknown

|Co-operative Commonwealth Fed.
|Edgar Westmoreland
|align="right"|6,011 
|align="right"|7.91%
|align="right"|
|align="right"|unknown

|Liberal
|Robert Wilkinson
|align="right"|8,883
|align="right"|11.69%
|align="right"|
|align="right"|unknown
|- bgcolor="white"
!align="right" colspan=3|Total valid votes
!align="right"|75,967
!align="right"|100.00%
!align="right"|
|- bgcolor="white"
!align="right" colspan=3|Total rejected ballots
!align="right"|472
!align="right"|
!align="right"|
|- bgcolor="white"
!align="right" colspan=3|Turnout
!align="right"|%
!align="right"|
!align="right"|
|}

|Liberal
|Mary Louise Bollert
|align="right"|9,470 
|align="right"|9.95%

|Co-operative Commonwealth Fed.
|Albert Dawson Gordon
|align="right"|7,603 
|align="right"|7.99%

|Co-operative Commonwealth Fed.
|Helena Rose Gutteridge
|align="right"|8,183 
|align="right"|8.60%

|Liberal
|Harold Elsdale Molson
|align="right"|8,503 
|align="right"|8.94%

|Co-operative Commonwealth Fed.
|William Ewart Turner
|align="right"|7,662
|align="right"|8.05%

|Liberal
|George Moir Weir
|align="right"|11,073 
|align="right"|11.64%
|- bgcolor="white"
!align="right" colspan=3|Total valid votes
!align="right"|95,159 
|- bgcolor="white"
!align="right" colspan=3|Total rejected ballots
!align="right"|597
|}

|-

|Co-operative Commonwealth
|John Watkins Dunfield
|align="right"|11,980 
|align="right"|8.14%
|align="right"|
|align="right"|unknown

|Co-operative Commonwealth
|Margaret Ellen Eckland
|align="right"|11,334 
|align="right"|7.71%
|align="right"|
|align="right"|unknown

|Co-operative Commonwealth
|George Alfred Isherwood
|align="right"|11,820 
|align="right"|8.04%
|align="right"|
|align="right"|unknown

|- bgcolor="white"
!align="right" colspan=3|Total valid votes
!align="right"|147,085 
!align="right"|100.00%
!align="right"|
|- bgcolor="white"
!align="right" colspan=3|Total rejected ballots
!align="right"|1,559
!align="right"|
!align="right"|
|- bgcolor="white"
!align="right" colspan=3|Turnout
!align="right"|%
!align="right"|
!align="right"|
|}

For the elimination-ballot elections of 1952 and 1953 the riding's voters were presented with three ballots, one for each seat, with three separate candidate-races:

|-

|Independent
|Ernest Forbes Allistone
|align="right"|959
|align="right"|0.61%
|align="right"|
|align="right"|unknown

|Progressive Conservative
|Reginald Atherton
|align="right"|3,324
|align="right"|2.13%
|align="right"|
|align="right"|unknown

|Progressive Conservative
|Ebbie William Bowering
|align="right"|2,878
|align="right"|1.85%
|align="right"|
|align="right"|unknown

|Liberal
|Theodore Roosvelt Burnett
|align="right"|12,924
|align="right"|8.29%
|align="right"|
|align="right"|unknown

|Liberal
|Alexander Whidden Fisher
|align="right"|15,599
|align="right"|10.00%
|align="right"|
|align="right"|unknown

|Co-operative Commonwealth Fed.
|Frederick Norman Hill
|align="right"|8,435
|align="right"|5.41%
|align="right"|
|align="right"|unknown

|Liberal
|Arthur Laing
|align="right"|17,801
|align="right"|11.44%
|align="right"|
|align="right"|unknown

|Co-operative Commonwealth Fed.
|Winona Grace MacInnis
|align="right"|11,365
|align="right"|7.29%
|align="right"|
|align="right"|unknown

|Co-operative Commonwealth Fed.
|William James Gibbs Pierce
|align="right"|7,979
|align="right"|5.17%
|align="right"|
|align="right"|unknown

|Progressive Conservative
|Emma Loring Tinsman
|align="right"|1,822
|align="right"|1.69%
|align="right"|
|align="right"|unknown
|- bgcolor="white"
!align="right" colspan=3|Total valid votes
!align="right"|155,953
!align="right"|100.00%
!align="right"|
|- bgcolor="white"
!align="right" colspan=3|Total rejected ballots
!align="right"|561
!align="right"|
!align="right"|
|- bgcolor="white"
!align="right" colspan=3|Turnout
!align="right"|%
!align="right"|
!align="right"|
|}

|-

|Progressive Conservative
|Reginald Atherton
|align="right"|6,774 
|align="right"|3.92%
|align="right"|
|align="right"|unknown

|Liberal
|Francis Cecil Boyes
|align="right"|17,438 
|align="right"|10.09%
|align="right"|
|align="right"|unknown

|Liberal
|Samuel Joseph Dumaresq
|align="right"|15,107 
|align="right"|8.74%
|align="right"|
|align="right"|unknown

|Co-operative Commonwealth Fed.
|George Nelson Gibson
|align="right"|12,158
|align="right"|7.03%
|align="right"|
|align="right"|unknown

|Co-operative Commonwealth Fed.
|Clifford Augustine Greer
|align="right"|12,702
|align="right"|7.35%
|align="right"|
|align="right"|unknown

|Progressive Conservative
|Desmond Fife Kidd
|align="right"|6,453 
|align="right"|3.73%
|align="right"|
|align="right"|unknown

|Progressive Conservative
|Mary Helen Poaps
|align="right"|4,029
|align="right"|2.33%
|align="right"|
|align="right"|unknown

|Co-operative Commonwealth Fed.
|Thomas Walter Thomason
|align="right"|11,538
|align="right"|6.68%
|align="right"|
|align="right"|unknown

|Liberal
|Leslie Charles Way
|align="right"|14,827 
|align="right"|8.58%
|align="right"|
|align="right"|unknown
|- bgcolor="white"
!align="right" colspan=3|Total valid votes
!align="right"|172,832
!align="right"|100.00%
!align="right"|
|- bgcolor="white"
!align="right" colspan=3|Total rejected ballots
!align="right"|803

|-

|Progressive Conservative
|Ernest James (Ernie) Broome
|align="right"|7,643 
|align="right"|4.26%
|align="right"|
|align="right"|unknown

|Progressive Conservative
|H. Richardson (Dick) Malkin
|align="right"|7,213 
|align="right"|4.02%
|align="right"|
|align="right"|unknown

|Liberal
|Patrick Lucey McGeer
|align="right"|25,592
|align="right"|14.26%
|align="right"|
|align="right"|unknown

|Liberal
|Arthur Phillips
|align="right"|16,510 
|align="right"|9.20%
|align="right"|
|align="right"|unknown

|Progressive Conservative
|Harry Purdy
|align="right"|15,719 
|align="right"|8.76%
|align="right"|
|align="right"|unknown

|Liberal
|William George Rathie
|align="right"|17,641 
|align="right"|9.83%
|align="right"|
|align="right"|unknown

|- bgcolor="white"
!align="right" colspan=3|Total valid votes
!align="right"|179,472
!align="right"|100.00%
!align="right"|
|- bgcolor="white"
!align="right" colspan=3|Total rejected ballots
!align="right"|726
!align="right"|
!align="right"|
|- bgcolor="white"
!align="right" colspan=3|Turnout
!align="right"|%
!align="right"|
!align="right"|
|}

|-

|Liberal
|Garde Basil Gardom
|align="right"|13,507
|align="right"|26.99%
|align="right"|
|align="right"|unknown

|Liberal
|Patrick Lucey McGeer
|align="right"|17,400
|align="right"|30.28%
|align="right"|
|align="right"|unknown

|- bgcolor="white"
!align="right" colspan=3|Total valid votes
!align="right"|57,472 
!align="right"|100.00%
!align="right"|
|- bgcolor="white"
!align="right" colspan=3|Total rejected ballots
!align="right"|392
!align="right"|
!align="right"|
|- bgcolor="white"
!align="right" colspan=3|Turnout
!align="right"|%
!align="right"|
!align="right"|
|}

|-

|Progressive Conservative
|John Anthony St. Etienne DeWolfe
|align="right"|1,087 
|align="right"|1.94%
|align="right"|
|align="right"|unknown

|Liberal
|Garde Basil Gardom
|align="right"|13,621
|align="right"|24.27%
|align="right"|
|align="right"|unknown

|Liberal
|Patrick Lucey McGeer
|align="right"|15,650
|align="right"|24.76%
|align="right"|
|align="right"|unknown

|- bgcolor="white"
!align="right" colspan=3|Total valid votes
!align="right"|63,196
!align="right"|100.00%
!align="right"|
|- bgcolor="white"
!align="right" colspan=3|Total rejected ballots
!align="right"|258
!align="right"|
!align="right"|
|- bgcolor="white"
!align="right" colspan=3|Turnout
!align="right"|%
!align="right"|
!align="right"|
|}

|-

|Liberal
|Garde Basil Gardom
|align="right"|13,673
|align="right"|20.72%
|align="right"|
|align="right"|unknown

|Progressive Conservative
|Ian Bruce Kelsey
|align="right"|5,103 
|align="right"|7.73%
|align="right"|
|align="right"|unknown

|Progressive Conservative
|Marianne Linnell
|align="right"|5,696 
|align="right"|8.63%
|align="right"|
|align="right"|unknown

|Liberal
|Patrick Lucey McGeer
|align="right"|14,599
|align="right"|22.13%
|align="right"|
|align="right"|unknown

|- bgcolor="white"
!align="right" colspan=3|Total valid votes
!align="right"|65,975 
!align="right"|100.00%
!align="right"|
|- bgcolor="white"
!align="right" colspan=3|Total rejected ballots
!align="right"|387
!align="right"|
!align="right"|
|- bgcolor="white"
!align="right" colspan=3|Turnout
!align="right"|%
!align="right"|
!align="right"|
|}

|-

|Progressive Conservative
|Richard Neill MacLeod Brown
|align="right"|1,340 
|align="right"|1.86%
|align="right"|
|align="right"|unknown

|Progressive Conservative
|Theodore Bolton Burgoyne
|align="right"|1,032
|align="right"|1.44%
|align="right"|
|align="right"|unknown

|Independent
|George Henry Does
|align="right"|98
|align="right"|0.14%
|align="right"|
|align="right"|unknown

|Liberal
|Richard John Joseph Durante
|align="right"|5,004
|align="right"|6.96%
|align="right"|
|align="right"|unknown

|Liberal
|Moyra Anne Roberts
|align="right"|4,383
|align="right"|6.10%
|align="right"|
|align="right"|unknown

|- bgcolor="white"
!align="right" colspan=3|Total valid votes
!align="right"|71,885
!align="right"|100.00%
!align="right"|
|- bgcolor="white"
!align="right" colspan=3|Total rejected ballots
!align="right"|554
!align="right"|
!align="right"|
|- bgcolor="white"
!align="right" colspan=3|Turnout
!align="right"|%
!align="right"|
!align="right"|
|}

|-

|Progressive Conservative
|William Fairley
|align="right"|2,511 
|align="right"|3.17%
|align="right"|
|align="right"|unknown

|Progressive Conservative
|Elizabeth L. Green
|align="right"|2,437 
|align="right"|3.08%
|align="right"|
|align="right"|unknown

|Liberal
|Timothy Charles O'Brien
|align="right"|1,399
|align="right"|1.77%
|align="right"|
|align="right"|unknown

|Liberal
|Christopher Keith Sumner
|align="right"|1,131
|align="right"|1.43%
|align="right"|
|align="right"|unknown

|- bgcolor="white"
!align="right" colspan=3|Total valid votes
!align="right"|79,151
!align="right"|100.00%
!align="right"|
|- bgcolor="white"
!align="right" colspan=3|Total rejected ballots
!align="right"|1,274
!align="right"|
!align="right"|
|- bgcolor="white"
!align="right" colspan=3|Turnout
!align="right"|%
!align="right"|
!align="right"|
|}

|-

|Liberal
|Leopold Auer
|align="right"|1,675
|align="right"|1.98%
|align="right"|
|align="right"|unknown

|Progressive Conservative
|Lorne Neil MacLean
|align="right"|1,573 
|align="right"|1.86%
|align="right"|
|align="right"|unknown

|Progressive Conservative
|William Fairley
|align="right"|2,511 
|align="right"|3.17%
|align="right"|
|align="right"|unknown

|Liberal
|Allan Edward Warnke
|align="right"|2,048
|align="right"|2.41%
|align="right"|
|align="right"|unknown
|- bgcolor="white"
!align="right" colspan=3|Total valid votes
!align="right"|84,826
!align="right"|100.00%
!align="right"|
|- bgcolor="white"
!align="right" colspan=3|Total rejected ballots
!align="right"|480
!align="right"|
!align="right"|
|- bgcolor="white"
!align="right" colspan=3|Turnout
!align="right"|%
!align="right"|
!align="right"|
|}

|Liberal
|Doreen Braverman
|align="right"|6,680 
|align="right"|7.88%

|Liberal
|Thomas Airlie Brown
|align="right"|5,505 
|align="right"|6.49%

|- bgcolor="white"
!align="right" colspan=3|Total valid votes
!align="right"|84,815
|- bgcolor="white"
!align="right" colspan=3|Total rejected ballots
!align="right"|682
|}

In 1988, Kim Campbell resigned as the MLA to run in the federal election. Tom Perry (NDP) won the seat in the 1989 by-election, finishing the term with Marzari as his seatmate. A redistribution before the 1991 election dramatically changed Vancouver's long-standing electoral map by the abandonment of the century-old multiple member districts. Vancouver-Point Grey was trimmed with parts of going to the creation of Vancouver-Quilchena, Vancouver-Langara, and Vancouver-Burrard (mostly to Quilchena). In the 1991 election, Perry changed ridings and was elected in Vancouver-Little Mountain.

Notes

External links 

Map
BC Stats Profile
 Elections BC Historical Returns 1871–1986
 Elections BC Historical Returns 1987–2001
Results of 2001 election (pdf)
2001 Expenditures (pdf)
Results of 1996 election
1996 Expenditures
Results of 1991 election
1991 Expenditures
Website of the Legislative Assembly of British Columbia

Politics of Vancouver
British Columbia provincial electoral districts
University Endowment Lands
Provincial electoral districts in Greater Vancouver and the Fraser Valley